The Shadow Leader of the House of Lords, also referred as the Leader of the Opposition in the House of Lords, is the person who leads the Official Opposition in the House of Lords. Their job is to work with the Leader, Lord Speaker and other senior Lords to organise business. They also work with the opposition Chief Whip and other party spokespeople to organise the party. The holder of this office would normally become Leader of the House of Lords if the party wins an election and forms the government. This position has been held by Baroness Smith of Basildon since 27 May 2015. In the nineteenth century, party affiliations were generally less fixed and the leaders in the two Houses were often of equal status. A single and clear Leader of the Opposition was only definitively settled if the opposition leader in the House of Commons or House of Lords was the outgoing prime minister. However, since the Parliament Act 1911, there has been no dispute that the leader in the House of Commons is pre-eminent and has always held the primary title.

Shadow Leaders of the House of Lords (1911-present)
This only lists leaders from the 1911 Parliament Act, as that's when the Common's Leader of the Opposition was put as pre-eminent over the Lords. Previous Leaders are here

Notes
  During Asquith's coalition government of 1915–1916, there was no formal opposition in either the Commons or the Lords.
  The Labour Party did not appoint a leader in the Lords until it formed its first government in 1924.
  The Marquess of Salisbury from 1947
  The Earl Alexander of Hillsborough from 1963

See also
 Official Opposition frontbench
 Shadow Cabinet of Keir Starmer
 Shadow Leader of the House of Commons

Official Opposition (United Kingdom)
Government of Northern Ireland